Gregory Redquest (born July 30, 1956) is a Canadian retired professional ice hockey goaltender who played in one National Hockey League game for the Pittsburgh Penguins during the 1977–78 NHL season.

See also
List of players who played only one game in the NHL

External links

1956 births
Living people
Canadian ice hockey goaltenders
Columbus Owls players
Flint Generals players
Hamilton Fincups players
Hamilton Red Wings (OHA) players
Hampton Aces players
Ice hockey people from Toronto
Oshawa Generals players
Pittsburgh Penguins draft picks
Pittsburgh Penguins players